Time management is the process of planning and exercising conscious control of time spent on specific activities, especially to increase effectiveness, efficiency, and productivity. It involves of various demands upon a person relating to work, social life, family, hobbies, personal interests, and commitments with the finite nature of time. Using time effectively gives the person "choice" on spending or managing activities at their own time and expediency. Time management may be aided by a range of skills, tools, and techniques used to manage time when accomplishing specific tasks, projects, and goals complying with a due date. Initially, time management referred to just business or work activities, but eventually, the term broadened to include personal activities as well. A time management system is a designed combination of processes, tools, techniques, and methods. Time management is usually a necessity in any project management as it determines the project completion time and scope. 

The major themes arising from the literature on time management include creating an environment conducive to effectiveness (in terms of cost-benefit, quality of results, and time to complete tasks or project), setting of priorities, the related process of reduction of time spent on non-priorities, and implementation of goals.

Cultural views of time management 
Differences in the way a culture views time can affect the way their time is managed. For example, a linear time view is a way of conceiving time as flowing from one moment to the next in a linear fashion. This linear perception of time is predominant in America along with most Northern European countries, such as Germany, Switzerland, and England. People in these cultures tend to place a large value on productive time management, and tend to avoid decisions or actions that would result in wasted time. This linear view of time correlates to these cultures being more “monochronic”, or preferring to do only one thing at a time. Generally speaking, this cultural view leads to a better focus on accomplishing a singular task and hence, more productive time management.

Another cultural time view is multi-active time view. In multi-active cultures, most people feel that the more activities or tasks being done at once the better. This creates a sense of happiness. Multi-active cultures are “polychronic” or prefer to do multiple tasks at once. This multi-active time view is prominent in most Southern European countries such as Spain, Portugal, and Italy. In these cultures, the people often tend to spend time on things they deem to be more important such as placing a high importance on finishing social conversations. In business environments, they often pay little attention to how long meetings last, rather the focus is on having high quality meetings. In general, the cultural focus tends to be on synergy and creativity over efficiency.

A final cultural time view is a cyclical time view. In cyclical cultures, time is considered neither linear nor event related. Because days, months, years, seasons, and events happen in regular repetitive occurrences, time is viewed as cyclical. In this view, time is not seen as wasted because it will always come back later, hence there is an unlimited amount of it. This cyclical time view is prevalent throughout most countries in Asia, including Japan and China. It is more important in cultures with cyclical concepts of time to complete tasks correctly, therefore most people will spend more time thinking about decisions and the impact they will have, before acting on their plans. Most people in cyclical cultures tend to understand that other cultures have different perspectives of time and are cognizant of this when acting on a global stage.

Creating an effective environment
Some time-management literature stresses tasks related to creating an environment conducive to "real" effectiveness. These strategies include principles such as:
 "get organized" - the triage of paperwork and of tasks,
 "protecting one's time" by insulation, isolation, and delegation,
 "achievement through goal-management and through goal-focus" - motivational emphasis,
 "recovering from bad time-habits" - recovery from underlying psychological problems, e.g. procrastination.

Also, the timing of tackling tasks is important. As tasks requiring high levels of concentration and mental energy are often done at the beginning of the day when a person is more refreshed. Literature also focuses on overcoming chronic psychological issues such as procrastination.

Excessive and chronic inability to manage time effectively may result from attention deficit hyperactivity disorder (ADHD). Diagnostic criteria include a sense of underachievement, difficulty getting organized, trouble getting started, trouble managing many simultaneous projects, and trouble with follow-through. Daniel Amen focuses on the prefrontal cortex which is the most recently evolved part of the brain. It manages the functions of attention span, impulse management, organization, learning from experience, and self-monitoring, among others. Some authors argue that changing the way the prefrontal cortex works is possible and offer a solution.

Setting priorities and goals

Time management strategies are often associated with the recommendation to set personal goals. The literature stresses themes such as:
 "Work in Priority Order" – set goals and prioritize,
 "Set gravitational goals" – that attract actions automatically.

These goals are recorded and may be broken down into a project, an action plan, or a simple task list. For individual tasks or for goals, an importance rating may be established, deadlines may be set, and priorities assigned. This process results in a plan with a task list, schedule, or calendar of activities. Authors may recommend a daily, weekly, monthly, or other planning periods, associated with different scope of planning or review. This is done in various ways, as follows:

ABCD analysis
A technique that has been used in business management for a long time is the categorization of large data into groups. These groups are often marked A, B, C and D—hence the name. Activities are ranked by these general criteria:
 A – Tasks that are perceived as being urgent and important,
 B – Tasks that are important but not urgent,
 C – Tasks that are unimportant but urgent,
 D – Tasks that are unimportant and not urgent.
Each group is then rank-ordered by priority - to further refine the prioritization, some individuals choose to then force-rank all "B" items as either "A" or "C". ABC analysis can incorporate more than three groups.

Pareto analysis

The Pareto principle is the idea that 80% of consequences come from 20% of causes. Applied to productivity, it means that 80% of results can be achieved by doing 20% of tasks. If productivity is the aim of time management, then these tasks should be prioritized higher.

The Eisenhower Method 

The "Eisenhower Method" or "Eisenhower Principle" is a method that utilizes the principles of importance and urgency to organize priorities and workload. This method stems from a quote attributed to Dwight D. Eisenhower: "I have two kinds of problems, the urgent and the important. The urgent are not important, and the important are never urgent." Eisenhower did not claim this insight for his own, but attributed it to an (unnamed) "former college president."

Using the Eisenhower Decision Principle, tasks are evaluated using the criteria important/unimportant and urgent/not urgent, and then placed in according quadrants in an Eisenhower Matrix (also known as an "Eisenhower Box" or "Eisenhower Decision Matrix"). Tasks in the quadrants are then handled as follows.

 Important/Urgent quadrant tasks are done immediately and personally, e.g. crises, deadlines, problems.
 Important/Not Urgent quadrant tasks get an end date and are done personally, e.g. relationships, planning, recreation.
 Unimportant/Urgent quadrant tasks are delegated, e.g. interruptions, meetings, activities.
 Unimportant/Not Urgent quadrant tasks are dropped, e.g. time wasters, pleasant activities, trivia.

POSEC method 

POSEC is an acronym for "Prioritize by Organizing, Streamlining, Economizing and Contributing". The method dictates a template which emphasizes an average individual's immediate sense of emotional and monetary security. It suggests that by attending to one's personal responsibilities first, an individual is better positioned to shoulder collective responsibilities.

Inherent in the acronym is a hierarchy of self-realization, which mirrors Abraham Maslow's hierarchy of needs.
 Prioritize your time and define your life by goals.
 Organize things you have to accomplish regularly to be successful (family and finances).
 Streamline things you may not like to do, but must do (work and chores).
 Economize things you should do or may even like to do, but they're not pressingly urgent (pastimes and socializing).
 Contribute by paying attention to the few remaining things that make a difference (social obligations).

Elimination of non-priorities

Time management also covers how to eliminate tasks that do not provide value to the individual or organization.

The software executive Elisabeth Hendrickson asserts that rigid adherence to task lists can create a "tyranny of the to-do list" that forces one to "waste time on unimportant activities".

Part of setting priorities and goals is the emotion "worry," and its function is to ignore the present to fixate on a future that never arrives, which leads to the fruitless expense of one's time and energy. It is an unnecessary cost or a false aspect that can interfere with plans due to human factors. The Eisenhower Method is a strategy used to compete with worry and dull-imperative tasks. Worry as stress is a reaction to a set of environmental factors; understanding this is not a part of the person gives the person possibilities to manage them. Athletes under a coach call this management as "putting on the game face."

Change is hard, and daily life patterns are the most deeply ingrained habits of all. To eliminate non-priorities in study time, it is suggested to divide the tasks, capture the moments, review task handling method, postpone unimportant tasks (understanding that a task's current relevancy and sense of urgency reflect the wants of the person rather than the task's importance), manage life balance (rest, sleep, leisure), and cheat leisure and nonproductive time (hearing audio taping of lectures, going through presentations of lectures when in a queue, etc.).

Certain unnecessary factors that affect time management are habits, lack of task definition (lack of clarity), over-protectiveness of the work, the guilt of not meeting objectives and subsequent avoidance of present tasks, defining tasks with higher expectations than their worth (over-qualifying), focusing on matters that have an apparent positive outlook without assessing their importance to personal needs, tasks that require support and time, sectional interests, and conflicts, etc. A habituated systematic process becomes a device that the person can use with ownership for effective time management.

Implementation of goals

A task list (also called a to-do list or "things-to-do") is a list of tasks to be completed, such as chores or steps toward completing a project. It is an inventory tool which serves as an alternative or supplement to memory.

Task lists are used in self-management, business management, project management, and software development. It may involve more than one list.

When one of the items on a task list is accomplished, the task is checked or crossed off. The traditional method is to write these on a piece of paper with a pen or pencil, usually on a note pad or clip-board. Task lists can also have the form of paper or software checklists.

Writer Julie Morgenstern suggests "do's and don'ts" of time management that include:
 Map out everything that is important, by making a task list.
 Create "an oasis of time" for one to manage.
 Say "No".
 Set priorities.
 Don't drop everything.
 Don't think a critical task will get done in one's spare time.

Numerous digital equivalents are now available, including personal information management (PIM) applications and most PDAs. There are also several web-based task list applications, many of which are free.

Task list organization 

Task lists are often diarized and tiered. The simplest tiered system includes a general to-do list (or task-holding file) to record all the tasks the person needs to accomplish and a daily to-do list which is created each day by transferring tasks from the general to-do list. An alternative is to create a "not-to-do list", to avoid unnecessary tasks.

Task lists are often prioritized in the following ways.
 A daily list of things to do, numbered in the order of their importance and done in that order one at a time as daily time allows, is attributed to consultant Ivy Lee (1877–1934) as the most profitable advice received by Charles M. Schwab (1862–1939), president of the Bethlehem Steel Corporation.
 An early advocate of "ABC" prioritization was Alan Lakein, in 1973. In his system "A" items were the most important ("A-1" the most important within that group), "B" next most important, "C" least important.
 A particular method of applying the ABC method assigns "A" to tasks to be done within a day, "B" a week, and "C" a month.
 To prioritize a daily task list, one either records the tasks in the order of highest priority, or assigns them a number after they are listed ("1" for highest priority, "2" for second highest priority, etc.) which indicates in which order to execute the tasks. The latter method is generally faster, allowing the tasks to be recorded more quickly.
 Another way of prioritizing compulsory tasks (group A) is to put the most unpleasant one first. When it's done, the rest of the list feels easier. Groups B and C can benefit from the same idea, but instead of doing the first task (which is the most unpleasant) right away, it gives motivation to do other tasks from the list to avoid the first one.

A completely different approach which argues against prioritizing altogether was put forward by British author Mark Forster in his book "Do It Tomorrow and Other Secrets of Time Management". This is based on the idea of operating "closed" to-do lists, instead of the traditional "open" to-do list. He argues that the traditional never-ending to-do lists virtually guarantees that some of your work will be left undone. This approach advocates getting all your work done, every day, and if you are unable to achieve it, that helps you diagnose where you are going wrong and what needs to change.

Various writers have stressed potential difficulties with to-do lists such as the following.
 Management of the list can take over from implementing it. This could be caused by procrastination by prolonging the planning activity. This is akin to analysis paralysis. As with any activity, there's a point of diminishing returns.
 To remain flexible, a task system must allow for disaster. A company must be ready for a disaster. Even if it is a small disaster, if no one made time for this situation, it can metastasize, potentially causing damage to the company.
 To avoid getting stuck in a wasteful pattern, the task system should also include regular (monthly, semi-annual, and annual) planning and system-evaluation sessions, to weed out inefficiencies and ensure the user is headed in the direction he or she truly desires.
 If some time is not regularly spent on achieving long-range goals, the individual may get stuck in a perpetual holding pattern on short-term plans, like staying at a particular job much longer than originally planned.

Software applications 

Many companies use time tracking software to track an employee's working time, billable hours, etc., e.g. law practice management software.

Many software products for time management support multiple users. They allow the person to give tasks to other users and use the software for communication and to prioritize tasks. 

Task-list applications may be thought of as lightweight personal information manager or project management software.

Modern task list applications may have built-in task hierarchy (tasks are composed of subtasks which again may contain subtasks), may support multiple methods of filtering and ordering the list of tasks, and may allow one to associate arbitrarily long notes for each task. 

In contrast to the concept of allowing the person to use multiple filtering methods, at least one software product additionally contains a mode where the software will attempt to dynamically determine the best tasks for any given moment.

Time management systems

Time management systems often include a time clock or web-based application used to track an employee's work hours. Time management systems give employers insights into their workforce, allowing them to see, plan and manage employees' time. Doing so allows employers to manage labor costs and increase productivity. A time management system automates processes, which eliminates paperwork and tedious tasks.

GTD (Getting Things Done)
Getting Things Done was created by David Allen. The basic idea behind this method is to finish all the small tasks immediately and a big task is to be divided into smaller tasks to start completing now. The reasoning behind this is to avoid the information overload or "brain freeze" which is likely to occur when there are hundreds of tasks. The thrust of GTD is to encourage the user to get their tasks and ideas out and on paper and organized as quickly as possible so they're easy to manage and see.

Pomodoro
Francesco Cirillo's "Pomodoro Technique" was originally conceived in the late 1980s and gradually refined until it was later defined in 1992. The technique is the namesake of a Pomodoro (Italian for tomato) shaped kitchen timer initially used by Cirillo during his time at university. The "Pomodoro" is described as the fundamental metric of time within the technique and is traditionally defined as being 30 minutes long, consisting of 25 minutes of work and 5 minutes of break time. Cirillo also recommends a longer break of 15 to 30 minutes after every four Pomodoros. Through experimentation involving various workgroups and mentoring activities, Cirillo determined the "ideal Pomodoro" to be 20–35 minutes long.

Related concepts

Time management is related to the following concepts.
 Project management: Time management can be considered to be a project management subset and is more commonly known as project planning and project scheduling. Time management has also been identified as one of the core functions identified in project management.
 Attention management relates to the management of cognitive resources, and in particular the time that humans allocate their mind (and organize the minds of their employees) to conduct some activities.
 Timeblocking is a time management strategy that specifically advocates for allocating chunks of time to dedicated tasks in order to promote deeper focus and productivity.

Organizational time management is the science of identifying, valuing and reducing time cost wastage within organizations. It identifies, reports and financially values sustainable time, wasted time and effective time within an organization and develops the business case to convert wasted time into productive time through the funding of products, services, projects or initiatives as a positive return on investment.

See also

 Action item
 African time
 Attention management
 Calendaring software
 Chronemics
 Flow (psychology)
 Gantt chart
 Goal setting
 Interruption science
 Maestro concept
 Opportunity cost
 Order
 Polychronicity
 Precommitment
 Procrastination
 Professional organizing
 Prospective memory
 Punctuality
 Self-help
 Task management
 Time and attendance
 Time perception
 Time to completion
 Time-tracking software
 Time value of money
 Work activity management
 Workforce management
 Workforce modeling

Books:
 First Things First (book)
 The 7 Habits of Highly Effective People

Systems:
 Getting Things Done
 Pomodoro Technique

Psychology/Neuroscience/Psychiatry
 Habit
 Self-control
 Impulsivity
 Inhibitory control
 Attention deficit hyperactivity disorder

References

Further reading 

 
 
 
 

 
Management systems